The 2017–18 Super Four Provincial Tournament was a first-class cricket tournament, that was played in Sri Lanka during March and April 2018. It took place following the conclusion of the 2017–18 Premier League Tournament and featured four teams based on the Centers of Excellence in Sri Lanka. It was the first time this type of tournament has been played in Sri Lanka since 2013. Galle won the tournament, finishing ahead of Dambulla, despite Dambulla winning a game, with Galle drawing all their fixtures.

Sri Lanka Cricket (SLC) announced the fixtures on 21 March 2018, with the second round of matches played as day/night games. The day/night matches were used as preparation for the day/night Test match, which was played during Sri Lanka's tour of the West Indies in June 2018. Following the conclusion of the tournament, a limited overs tournament took place with the same teams.

Points table

Squads
The following teams and squads were named to compete in the tournament:

Fixtures

Round 1

Round 2

Round 3

References

External links
 Series home at ESPN Cricinfo

Super Four Provincial Tournament
Super Provincial Four Tournament